Toontastic 3D is a Educational mobile app developed by Google. Toontastic 3D is a creative storytelling app that empowers kids to draw, animate, narrate and record their own cartoons on their tablets.

History 
Toontastic was originally launched in 2011 by LaunchPad Toys. Toontastic has been developed over several years by Andy Russell and Thusal Amarasirlwardena in touch environments and was just waiting for the pad to come along. Andy is Learning sciences graduate from Stanford and Northwestern University.

Later Google acquired it's company LaunchPad Toys in 2015.

In 2017 Google Launched it's Toontastic 3D app.

See also 

 List of Android apps by Google

External links 

 Official website

References 

Google software
Android (operating system) software
Software for children